Consuelo González Ramos (7 June 1877 - ?; also known by her pseudonyms Celsia Regis and Doñeva de Campos) was a Spanish journalist, nurse, and feminist.

González was born in Villamayor de Campos, Province of Zamora in 7 June 1877. She worked as a nurse during the Rif War, experiences that ushered in La mujer española en la campaña del Kert (1912). She supported women's voting rights. She founded the publication La Voz de la Mujer in 1917, which she directed until 1931. She also founded the Asociación Nacional de Mujeres Españolas (1918), the International Federation Feminist (1919), and the Union of Spanish Feminism (1924). González favored a conservative and Catholic feminism, and supported the dictatorship of Primo de Rivera. González wrote for the newspaper, El Telegrama del Rif.

References

Bibliography 
 
 

Year of death unknown
Spanish feminists
1877 births
Spanish journalists
People from Zamora, Spain
Spanish women journalists
Spanish nurses